Kuthond or Kuthaund is a small town and panchayat of Jalaun in Uttar Pradesh, India. This town is 16 km from Auraiya and 26 km from Jalaun.

Education 

The town has several schools and colleges, including the Janta Sanatan Dharm Inter College.

Culture 

The main Hindu temples in Kuthaund include Ram Janki Temple, Hanuman Temple, Badi Mata temple and Maha Kaleshwar Temple, Narmdeshwar Maharaj Temple, Gadhi Wale Baba.

See also
Naurejpur

References 

Cities and towns in Jalaun district